Wings of Tomorrow is the second studio album by the Swedish heavy metal band Europe. It was released on 24 February 1984, by Hot Records. Wings of Tomorrow is the last album to feature drummer Tony Reno.

The song "Scream of Anger" was originally titled "Black Journey Through My Soul".

Track listing

Personnel

Europe
Joey Tempest – vocals, acoustic guitars, keyboards
John Norum – guitars, background vocals
John Levén – bass guitar
Tony Reno – drums

Production
Leif Mases – producer, engineer
Peter Engberg – cover illustration
Magnus Elgquist – photography
Camilla B. – cover design

Charts

Cover versions
"Wings of Tomorrow" and "Scream of Anger" have been covered by the melodic death metal band Arch Enemy. The latter, notes guitarist Michael Amott in the liner notes for Wages of Sin (on the bonus CD of which the song appears), was "recorded and mixed during the Burning Bridges sessions, December 1998/January 1999. Originally released on the Japanese version of Burning Bridges. A cover version of the most successful hard rock band to ever emerge from Sweden (no, that's not Arch Enemy!)… It was the most aggressive track of their career – and probably one of Arch Enemy's softest moments? Anyhow, we learnt it and recorded it in an afternoon." Amott guested with Europe when they played Wings of Tomorrow in its entirety, in Stockholm, on 3 March 2014. "He is a friend of the band and grew up listening to Europe's music," reported Joey Tempest. "It was an honour and so much fun to have him with us on stage!"

References 

Europe (band) albums
1984 albums
Epic Records albums